Nacra 17 World Championship is an annual World Championship sailing regatta in the Nacra 17 class organised by the Nacra 17 Class.

Editions

Medalists

All-time medal table

References

Nacra 17 World Championships
Recurring sporting events established in 2013